The 63rd parallel south is a circle of latitude that is 63 degrees south of the Earth's equatorial plane. It crosses the Southern Ocean and Antarctica.

At this latitude the sun is visible for 20 hours, 19 minutes during the December solstice and 4 hours, 42 minutes during the June solstice. If the latitude in the southern hemisphere is 63º45′ or smaller, everyday of the month of March (before equinox) can view both astronomical dawn and astronomical dusk.

Around the world
Starting at the Prime Meridian and heading eastwards, the parallel 63° south passes through:

{| class="wikitable plainrowheaders"
! scope="col" width="125" | Co-ordinates
! scope="col" | Continent or ocean
! scope="col" | Notes
|-
| style="background:#b0e0e6;" | 
! scope="row" style="background:#b0e0e6;" rowspan="4" | Southern Ocean
| style="background:#b0e0e6;" | South of the Atlantic Ocean
|-
| style="background:#b0e0e6;" | 
| style="background:#b0e0e6;" | South of the Indian Ocean
|-
| style="background:#b0e0e6;" | 
| style="background:#b0e0e6;" | South of the Pacific Ocean
|-
| style="background:#b0e0e6;" | 
| style="background:#b0e0e6;" | South of the Atlantic Ocean
|-
| 
! scope="row" | Antarctica
|-
| style="background:#b0e0e6;" | 
! scope="row" style="background:#b0e0e6;" | Southern Ocean
| style="background:#b0e0e6;" | South of the Atlantic Ocean
|-
| 
! scope="row" | Antarctica
|-
| style="background:#b0e0e6;" | 
! scope="row" style="background:#b0e0e6;" | Southern Ocean
| style="background:#b0e0e6;" | South of the Atlantic Ocean, passing 24 km north of Prime Head, Antarctic Peninsula
|-
| 
! scope="row" | Antarctica
|-
| style="background:#b0e0e6;" | 
! scope="row" style="background:#b0e0e6;" | Southern Ocean
| style="background:#b0e0e6;" | South of the Atlantic Ocean
|}

See also
62nd parallel south
64th parallel south

References

s63